Amelia  Bullock-Webster, Re [1936] NZGazLawRp 144; [1936] NZLR 814; (1936) 36 GLR 709 is a cited case in New Zealand case law regarding trusts.

References

High Court of New Zealand cases
Amelia Bullock-Webster
1936 in case law